The 1782 Vermont Republic gubernatorial election took place throughout September, and resulted in the re-election of Thomas Chittenden to a one-year term.

The Vermont General Assembly met in Manchester on October 10. The Vermont House of Representatives appointed a committee to examine the votes of the freemen of Vermont for governor, lieutenant governor, treasurer, and members of the governor's council. Thomas Chittenden was re-elected to a one-year term as governor.

The popular vote indicated that no candidate for lieutenant governor had received a majority. In keeping with the Vermont Constitution, the choice fell to the Vermont General Assembly, which chose Paul Spooner for a one-year term. Ira Allen was re-elected to a one-year term as treasurer. The names of candidates and balloting totals were not recorded.

Results

References

Vermont gubernatorial elections
1782 in Vermont
1782 elections in North America